Yankey is a surname. Notable people with the surname include:

Diana Yankey (born 1967), Ghanaian hurdler
Rachel Yankey (born 1979), English footballer
Yankey Willems (died 1688), Dutch buccaneer
David Yankey (born 1992), American football player

See also
 Yankee (disambiguation)